Du Mingxin (b. August 19, 1928) is a Chinese composer known for his work on ballets, concertos and a symphonic Beijing Opera.

Biography
His early studies include time at the famous Yucai School in Chongqing. He moved to Shanghai in 1948, where he performed as a pianist. He attended the Tchaikovsky Music Conservatory in Moscow from 1954 to 1958, before joining the Beijing Central Conservatory.

Notable works
 Collaborating on the ballet Red Detachment of Women (premiered 1964, possibly the best-known Chinese ballet).
 The Mermaid (ballet), with Wu Zuqiang
 The Goddess of the River Luo (symphonic fantasia)
 A violin concerto (1982) and three piano concertos, the first one subtitled Spirit of Spring (1988), the third one subtitled Gulangyu (2004)
 A symphonic version of the Beijing Opera, Women Generals of the Yangs, commissioned by the China Philharmonic Orchestra

Notable students
Qu Xiao-Song
Liu Sola

External links
 Photo
 Nixon views Red Detachment of Women
 Chinese composers
 Biography (in Chinese)

1928 births
Living people
20th-century classical composers
People's Republic of China composers
Chinese male classical composers
Chinese classical composers
20th-century male musicians